Duane "Dewey" Tomko (born December 31, 1946, in Glassport, Pennsylvania) is an American former kindergarten teacher turned professional poker player, based in Winter Haven, Florida.

Tomko was the runner-up in the World Series of Poker (WSOP) $10,000 no limit Texas hold'em Main Event in 1982 (to Jack Straus) and 2001 (to Carlos Mortensen). Besides his success in the Main Event, Tomko has won three WSOP bracelets, all in different variations of poker, in addition to various other tournament wins throughout his career.

Early life
Tomko was born and raised in Glassport, Pennsylvania, a suburb of Pittsburgh.  He began playing poker profitably as a 16-year-old in Pittsburgh pool halls, which allowed him to finance his education.

Tomko worked as a kindergarten teacher for several years, and often played poker through the night. After Tomko realised that playing poker was more profitable than his job, he left his full-time job, played poker full-time and invested a sum of his winnings into businesses.

Poker career
Tomko won his first career WSOP bracelet in 1979, in the $1,000 No Limit Hold'em event.  He defeated Duanne Hammrich heads-up to win the title and $48,000 cash prize.

At the 1984 WSOP, Dewey won two bracelets.  First, he won the $10,000 Deuce-to-Seven Draw event.  The next day, he went back-to-back, winning the $5,000 Pot Limit Omaha with re-buys event for his third bracelet.

In addition to his WSOP success, Tomko has made two World Poker Tour (WPT) final tables. He finished runner-up in the 2003 Five Diamond World Poker Classic for $552,853 and in fourth place in the Costa Rica Classic for $14,650.

Tomko has played every WSOP Main Event since 1974, which is currently the longest active streak.

Tomko finished in third place in the 2005 WSOP Deuce-To-Seven lowball event, worth $138,160.  He also made the final table of the first WSOP $50,000 buy-in H.O.R.S.E. tournament in 2006 ,which featured some of the best tournament and cash game poker players in the world. He finished in 7th place earning $343,200.

As of 2010, Tomko's total live tournament winnings exceeded $4,960,000. Just over half of his tournament winnings, $2,641,573, have come at the WSOP.  He is a 2008 inductee into the Poker Hall of Fame. He was inducted alongside Henry Orenstein.

World Series of Poker bracelets

Family
Tomko is married with a son. He also has three adult children from his first marriage. His son, Derek, encouraged him to return to playing poker tournaments.

Golf
Tomko is an excellent golfer, spending much of his time on the golf course when he is not playing poker.  He has played with many of his fellow high-stakes poker players like Doyle Brunson, Phil Ivey, and many others.  One of his most frequent golf partners is fellow poker professional Hilbert Shirey, who also lives in Tomko's hometown of Winter Haven, Florida.

Rick Reilly chronicles a day with Dewey on a golf course in his book Who's Your Caddy.  In it, he contends that Tomko is not interested in competition if there is not a wager riding on it.

On NBC's Poker After Dark, poker professional and 2004 WSOP Main Event champion Greg Raymer noted that professional golfer Rocco Mediate has said that if he had one person to putt for his life, it would be Tomko.

Notes

1946 births
American poker players
Living people
People from Glassport, Pennsylvania
People from Winter Haven, Florida
World Series of Poker bracelet winners
Super Bowl of Poker event winners
Poker Hall of Fame inductees